Calab Evans may refer to:

 Caleb Evans (geologist) (1831–1886), English geologist
 Caleb Evans (quarterback) (born 1998), gridiron football quarterback